Azuma is both a Japanese surname and a masculine Japanese given name. Notable people with the name include:

Surname 

 Fukashi Azuma (東 不可止, born 1966), Japanese producer and director for TV Tokyo
, Japanese shogi player
, Japanese mathematician
, Japanese manga artist
, Japanese manga artist and father of lolicon manga
, Japanese cultural critic
, Japanese footballer
, Japanese swimmer
Ronald Azuma, American engineer
, Japanese military officer
, Japanese physician and bureaucrat who served as Governor of Tokyo
, Japanese soldier
, Japanese ice hockey player
, Japanese sprinter
 Riki Azuma (リキアズマ), Japanese producer & rapper from Small Circle Of Friends

Given name 

, Japanese politician
, Japanese film director and screenwriter
, Japanese golfer

Fictional characters 
 Kyo Azuma (東 京), a character in Inazuma Eleven
 Azuma, a high-ranking courtesan in Chikamatsu Monzaemon's 1718 play The Love Suicides at Amijima
 Jo Azuma (東 丈), a character in Genma Taisen
, a character in Yakitate!! Japan
 Soma Azuma, a character in Onmyou Taisenki
 Tetsuya Azuma, also known as Casshan or Casshern, the main and eponymous character of the Casshan franchise
, Tetsuya's mother from Casshan
, a genius scientist from Casshan
 Azuma (Ghost in the Shell) (アズマ), a character in Ghost in the Shell: S.A.C. 2nd GIG
 Azuma, a member of the Grimoire Heart, and one of the Seven Kin of Purgatory in Fairy Tail
 Emily Azuma, a character in the webcomic Questionable Content
 Tokaku Azuma (東 兎角), one of the two main characters in the anime Riddle Story of Devil
 Azuma the Feldsher, a character in the video games Shadow Fight 3 and Shadow Fight Arena
 Manami Azuma, a character in Mousou Telepathy

Japanese-language surnames
Japanese masculine given names